Tita Rădulescu (born 18 December 1904, date of death unknown) was a Romanian bobsledder. He competed at the 1928 Winter Olympics and the 1936 Winter Olympics.

References

1904 births
Year of death missing
Romanian male bobsledders
Olympic bobsledders of Romania
Bobsledders at the 1928 Winter Olympics
Bobsledders at the 1936 Winter Olympics
People from Sinaia